The Sisters is the sixth studio album by American R&B vocal group Sister Sledge, released in 1982 by Cotillion Records. The album is the group's first self-produced album. It contains a remake of the Mary Wells hit "My Guy". The Sisters peaked at No. 14 on the Top R&B/Hip-Hop Albums chart as well as No. 69 on the Billboard 200 chart.

Track listing
"Super Bad Sisters" (Art Austin, Robert Allen, Debbie Sledge Young, Joni Sledge, Kathy Sledge Lightfoot, Kim Sledge) – 4:38
"My Guy" (William "Smokey" Robinson Jr.) – 3:46
"Lightfootin'" (Kathy Sledge Lightfoot, Phillip Lightfoot) – 3:59
"My Special Way" (Mark Moulin) – 5:03
"Grandma" (Art Austin, Robert Allen) – 3:50
"Get You in Our Love" (Michael Clark) – 3:53
"Il Mácquillage Lady" (Joni Sledge) – 3:57
"Everybody's Friend" (Kathy Sledge Lightfoot, Timothy J. Tobias) – 4:33
"All the Man I Need" (Dean Pitchford, Michael Gore) – 4:41
"Jacki's Theme: There's No Stopping Us" (Carol Conners, William Goldstein) – 4:07

Note: The song, "All the Man That I Need", would go on to be re-recorded (in a shortened, re-arranged version) by Whitney Houston, and would become an across-the-board smash hit in America, reaching the top spot on the Billboard Hot 100, the Adult Contemporary, the Hot R&B/Hip-Hop Songs and the Cash Box Hot 100.  Houston's spin on the song nixes the guitar solo, opting instead for a screaming sax break by Kenny G.

Personnel

Sister Sledge
 Kathy Sledge Lightfoot – lead vocals (2, 6), vocals (1–10)
 Joni Sledge – lead vocals (4, 7), vocals (1–10)
 Debbie Sledge Young – lead vocals (8), vocals (1–10)
 Kim Sledge – vocals (1–10)
with:
 James Williams, Kenneth Williams – rap (1)
 David Simmons – additional vocals (9)
 Nick Mundy – rhythm guitar (1–9), lead guitar (2, 5, 7–9)
 James "Herb" Smith – lead & rhythm guitar (10)
 Steve Gold – keyboards, synthesizer (1, 5)
 Jack Ebbert – keyboards (2, 4, 6, 9)
 Timothy J. Tobias – keyboards (8)
 Nathaniel Wilkie – keyboards (10)
 Robert (Bob) Allen – bass (1, 3, 5)
 Jimmy Williams – bass (2, 4, 6, 7, 8)
 Howard (CJ) Clark – bass (9)
 Jimmy "Funky" Williams – bass (10)
 Darryl Birgee – drums (1, 2, 4, 5, 6, 7, 8, 9)
 Phillip Lightfoot – drums (3, 10), electronic drums (10)
 Drew Henderson – percussion (1, 2, 3, 4, 5, 6, 7, 8)
 Larry Washington – percussion (10)

Production
 Arranged by Phillip Lightfoot (track 3), Sister Sledge (tracks 1–10)
 Horns & strings arranged by Jack Faith (1, 5), Jack Ebbert (2, 6, 9),  Roscoe Gill (4)
 Recording engineers: Arthur Stoppe, Dirk Devlin, Jim Gallagher, Joe Tarcia, Peter Humpheys
 Recording assistant engineers: Joe Bees, John Wisner, Michael Tarcia, Michael Spitz, Scott MacMin, Vince Warsavage
 Mixing engineer @ Power Station (New York City): Scott Litt (2, 7, 8)
 Mixing assistant engineer @ Power Station (New York City): Malcolm Pollack (2, 7, 8)
 Mixing & remixing engineer @ Sigma Sound Studios (Philadelphia): Joe Tarcia (1–10)
 Art direction by Bob Defrin
 Photography by Harry Langdon

Covers and samples

 "Il Macquillage Lady" was sampled by French electronic music band Daft Punk on their 2001 song "Aerodynamic", though the sample was uncredited.

In popular culture
 CBS Sports used "Jacki's Theme: There's No Stopping Us"  as the theme for its highlights of the 1982 NCAA Division I men's basketball tournament following the championship game. In the final, North Carolina defeated Georgetown 63-62, with the Tar Heels scoring the winning points on a jumper by freshman Michael Jordan with 16 seconds remaining. The game featured several future National Basketball Association stars and Naismith Basketball Hall of Fame inductees, including Jordan, James Worthy and Sam Perkins of North Carolina, and Patrick Ewing of Georgetown, along with legendary coaches Dean Smith (North Carolina) and John Thompson (Georgetown). Five years later, CBS first used "One Shining Moment" for tournament highlights, a tradition which continues to this day. The 1982 NCAA tournament was CBS' first after NBC Sports held the broadcast rights from 1969-81.

References

External links
 Sister Sledge - The Sisters (1982) album releases & credits at Discogs
 Sister Sledge - The Sisters (1982) album to be listened as stream on Spotify

1982 albums
Cotillion Records albums
Sister Sledge albums